Arthur Dehaine (20 June 1932 – 24 May 2020) was a French politician.

Biography
An accountant by profession, Dehaine joined the National Assembly representing Oise after René Quentier's death on 18 November 1976. He was defeated in 1981, but returned to his seat in 1986 following the death of Marcel Dassault. He stayed in office until 2002, succeeded by Éric Woerth. Dehaine also served as Mayor of Senlis from 1974 to 2008 after succeeding Jean Reymond.

In 2002, Dehaine was knighted into the Legion of Honour.

References

1932 births
2020 deaths
Mayors of places in Hauts-de-France
Deputies of the 5th National Assembly of the French Fifth Republic
Deputies of the 6th National Assembly of the French Fifth Republic
Deputies of the 8th National Assembly of the French Fifth Republic
Deputies of the 9th National Assembly of the French Fifth Republic
Deputies of the 10th National Assembly of the French Fifth Republic
Deputies of the 11th National Assembly of the French Fifth Republic
Rally for the Republic politicians
Chevaliers of the Légion d'honneur
French accountants